Ewen Bremner (born 23 January 1972) is a Scottish character actor. His roles have included Julien in Julien Donkey-Boy and Daniel "Spud" Murphy in Trainspotting and its 2017 sequel T2 Trainspotting.

Early life
Bremner was born in Edinburgh, the son of two art teachers. He attended Davidson's Mains Primary School and Portobello High School. He originally wanted to be a circus clown, but was offered a chance at screen acting by television director Richard D. Brooks. One of his first notable roles was as a Glasgow schoolboy in Charles Gormley's Heavenly Pursuits (1986). He also played the lead in the BBC Scotland feature-length adaptation of the William McIlvanney short story "Dreaming" (1990).

Career
Bremner portrayed Spud in Danny Boyle's film adaptation of Irvine Welsh's 1993 novel Trainspotting, and later Mullet, a street thug in Guy Ritchie's Snatch. In the 1994 stage version of Trainspotting, Bremner played the lead role of Mark Renton, the role played by Ewan McGregor in the 1996 film. He has played supporting roles in blockbusters such as Pearl Harbor and Black Hawk Down.

In 2017 he produced the short film No Song to Sing.

Personal life
He has one daughter, with actress Marcia Rose, whom he met during the filming of Skin.

Filmography

Film

Television

References

External links
 
 
 

1970 births
20th-century Scottish male actors
21st-century Scottish male actors
living people
male actors from Edinburgh
people educated at Portobello High School
Scottish male film actors
Scottish male stage actors
Scottish male television actors
Scottish male voice actors